Sigdal is a municipality in Viken county, Norway. The administrative centre of the municipality is the village of Prestfoss.

The municipality of Sigdal was established on 1 January 1838 (see formannskapsdistrikt). The area of Krødsherad was separated from Sigdal on 1 January 1901. The municipality has common borders with the municipalities of Flå, Krødsherad, Modum, Øvre Eiker, Flesberg, Rollag, and Nore og Uvdal.

Name
The Old Norse form of the name was Sigmardalr or Sigmudalr. The first element is the genitive case of a river name Sigm(a) (now called the Simoa) and the last element is dalr which means "valley" or "dale". The Simoa river runs through Sigdal, flowing in a south-easterly course until it flows into Drammenselva at Åmot in Modum. The meaning of the river name is unknown, but is maybe derived from síga which means to "ooze" or "slide".

Coat-of-arms
The coat-of-arms is from modern times. They were granted on 18 November 1983. The arms show a heraldic image of the mountain that dominates the view around the village, the Andersnatten. The profile of the mountain is yellow with a blue-colored sky above.

Geography and population
Most of the citizens live in the village of Eggedal or the administrative centre of Prestfoss. Sigdal is densely populated, dominated by mountains and valleys.

About 72% of the area is covered with forest, 20% is mountain areas, and 4% of the area is cultivated. Agriculture, forestry, and the kitchen-producing enterprise of Sigdal Kjøkken are still important industries.

Local Attractions
Folk Music Center (Folkemusikksenteret) is a cultural heritage museum offering a good image of the building style and traditions of the district. The Folk Music Center is principally responsible for collecting, storing and promoting local folk music and dance. 
Sigdal-Eggedal Museum is a regional museum for Krødsherad, Modum and Sigdal. This museum dedicated to the region's culture and history is arranged particularly authentically. 
Vatnås  Church (Vatnås kirke) is a historic church dating from  1660.
Lauvlia is the former home of Theodor Kittelsen, one of the most popular artists in Norway, who settled near Prestfoss during 1899. Today Lauvlia is a private museum featuring an exhibition of Kittelsen’s original work
Andersnatten is a well-known mountain and landmark. The mountain has inspired painters visiting or living in Sigdal, notably Theodor Kittelsen and Christian Skredsvig. It is recognized by mountain climbers as a tough challenge.

Protected areas in Sigdal Municipality
 Heimseteråsen nature reserve, established on 13 December 2002, 2,515 acres
 Solevatn nature reserve, established 20 June 1986, 538 acres
 Trillemarka nature reserve, established on 13 December 2002, 43,285 acres

Notable residents

 Christian Skredsvig (1854 - 1924) Norwegian artist and painter
 Theodor Kittelsen (1857 - 1914) Norwegian artist and painter
 Erik Ramstad (1860 - 1951) Norwegian-American founder of Minot, North Dakota
 Eileif Kolsrud (1873 – 1953) a Norwegian educator and politician, Mayor of Kristiansund 
 Gulbrand Hagen (1864 - 1919) Norwegian-American newspaper editor and writer
 Olaf Solumsmoen (1896 - 1972) a Norwegian newspaper editor and politician
 Olaf Knudson (1915 – 1996) politician, deputy mayor of Sigdal in 1950's
 Erling Kroken (1928-2007) a Norwegian ski jumper
 Dag Aabye (born 1941) an endurance runner in British Columbia, "Father of Freeride Skiing"
 Anne-Lise Berntsen (1943-2012) a Norwegian soprano 
 Grete Kummen (born 1952) a cross-country skier, competed at the 1976 Winter Olympics
 Josefine Frida Pettersen (born 1996) actress, played Noora Amalie Sætre in NRK drama series Skam

Sister cities
The following cities are twinned with Sigdal:
  Äänekoski, Central Finland, Finland
  Hveragerði, Iceland
  Örnsköldsvik, Västernorrland County, Sweden

Gallery

See also
Sigdal House

References

Other sources
Mørch, Andreas & Thormod Skatvedt Sigdal og Eggedal (Sigdal og Eggedal, 1914)
Mørch, Andreas Frå gamle dagar. Folkeminne frå Sigdal og Eggedal (Norsk Folkeminnelag: 1932)

External links

Municipal fact sheet from Statistics Norway

Kunstnerdalen, Valley of Artists
Sigdal & Eggedal Tourist Service
Sigdalslag
Sigdal Kommune official webpage 
Krødsherad, Sigdal and Modum 
Information and news from Sigdal and Eggedal 

 
Municipalities of Buskerud
Municipalities of Viken (county)
Ringerike (traditional district)

la:Ål